Gregory Lyons Segal (born June 13, 1984) is an American entrepreneur.

Career 
Segal began his career at Rethink Education, an education technology venture capital firm. In 2013 he co-founded the non-profit Organize to address the US organ donation shortage after his father waited five years for a heart transplant.

Segal's research has been heavily cited through two separate Congressional investigations from the Senate Finance Committee and the House Oversight Committee  into failures and abuses in the U.S. organ donation system, and has led to regulatory reforms projected by the U.S. Department of Health and Human Services to save more than 7,200 lives every year.

For his work at Organize, Segal was named to the Inc Magazine 35 Under 35 List and Oprah's 100 SuperSoul Influencers, and was awarded a Tribeca Disruptive Innovation Award and a 2016 Classy Award. He was a keynote presenter at the 2015 Stanford MedX Conference, where Organize was honored with the Inaugural Stanford MedX Health Care Design Award. Organize won the $1 Million 1st Prize in the 2014 Verizon Powerful Answers Award as the top healthcare start-up of the year and was awarded the Innovator in Residence position at the Office of the Secretary of the US Department of Health and Human Services. Inc Magazine called Segal one of the top 20 Disruptive Innovators of 2016.

Segal has been covered by The New York Times, which called Organize one of 2016's "Biggest Ideas in Social Change", as well as the Washington Post, Slate and FastCompany, and his work at Organize was highlighted on HBO's Last Week Tonight with John Oliver. Segal graduated from Duke University and was a member of President Barack Obama’s National Finance Committee. He is also a member of the Board of Directors at Bayes Impact and the Board of Advocates at Human Rights First.

References

1984 births
21st-century American businesspeople
Living people